The Convent of San Pablo is a sixteenth century former convent in Cuenca, Spain, that belonged to the Dominican Order. It stands on a promontory over the Huécar river facing the Hanging Houses. The church was finished in the eighteenth century, in rococo style. Since 1993 it houses a state-owned Parador hotel.

References

External links

 Hotel website

Paradores
16th-century Roman Catholic church buildings in Spain
Buildings and structures in Cuenca, Spain
Bien de Interés Cultural landmarks in the Province of Cuenca